Drycothaea stictica is a species of beetle in the family Cerambycidae. It was described by Bates in 1881. It is known from Belize, Guatemala, Honduras, Mexico, Panama, and El Salvador.

References

Calliini
Beetles described in 1881